The Kaufungen Forest is a range of steep, wooded hills straddling the border between the states of Hesse and Lower Saxony in central Germany. It takes its name from the town Kaufungen.

The hills lie in the fork of the Rivers Fulda and Werra, which meet at Hannoversch Münden just to the north. They are bounded to the west and north-west by the Fulda valley, and to the east and north-east by the Werra valley. The southern boundary is less clearly defined, as the range merges into the gentler hills of the Söhrewald to the south-west, and climbs towards the high plateau of the Hoher Meißner to the south-east.

The highest natural point is  Hirschberg; however the  summit of Bilstein forms a much better natural viewpoint, and since 1869 has been crowned with an observation tower. Other peaks include Mühlenstein,
Haferberg, Langenberg, Großer Steinberg and Kleiner Steinberg.

The area is popular for walking and especially for cycling; an extensive network of waymarked forestry and agricultural tracks provide excellent traffic-free routes. The annual Bilstein Bike Marathon attracts hundreds of mountain bikers to compete in races of varying length and difficulty. In winter, the same trails are used for cross-country skiing. The main tourist centre for the area is the small town of Großalmerode. Other settlements include Kaufungen (which lends its name to the range), Helsa and Nieste. The larger towns of Kassel, Witzenhausen and Hessisch Lichtenau lie on the western, eastern and southern fringes respectively.

The entire of the area enjoys protected status; the hills in Hesse form part of the Meißner-Kaufungen Forest Nature Park, while those in Lower Saxony belong to the Münden Nature Park. However, the southern part of the range may be affected by the planned extension of the A 44 autobahn from its present end in Kassel to Eisenach. The controversial extension, which has been delayed and rerouted several times on environmental grounds, is part of a national strategy to improve communications between the east and west of Germany, in the wake of reunification.

External links 
 Naturpark Meißner-Kaufunger Wald (in German)
 Naturpark Münden (in German)

Forests and woodlands of Lower Saxony
North Hesse
Hill ranges of Lower Saxony
Landforms of Hesse
Hill ranges of Germany
Forests and woodlands of Hesse
Natural regions of the East Hesse Highlands